The Thessaloniki Suburban Railway, is a three-line Proastiakos commuter rail service connecting the city of Thessaloniki with its metropolitan area and other regions beyond, including Imathia, Pella and Serres.

Unlike the Athens Suburban Railway, the three lines served are rather medium-distance regional rail connections on three major axes to Edessa and Serres, Central Macedonia, and Larissa, Thessaly. Thessaloniki metropolitan area itself will served by the Metro Thessaloniki.

History
Proastiakos Thessaloniki started its operations on 9 September 2007 with the first line Thessaloniki-Katerini-Litochoro connecting the urban centers of Thessaloniki, Katerini, and the beaches of South Pieria and was the first suburban connection of areas outside Athens.

On 7 September 2008, with the completion of the electric drive in the Thessaloniki-Domokos section, the line was extended to Larissa. Later, the already existing line Thessaloniki-Edessa via Veria was included as a suburban one with the prospect of electrification in the near future. At the same time, in May 2008, the preliminary feasibility study of the 'SUBURBAN REGIONAL RAILWAY OF THESSALONIKI' was completed, in which the new railway connection Thessaloniki - Pella through Giannitsa was included. This study, which was updated in March 2018 at a relevant conference in Giannitsa, awaits its finalization in accordance with the commitment of the Prime Minister, at the regional development conference for Central Macedonia held in March 2018 in Thessaloniki.

On February 3, 2020, a third suburban line was inaugurated that connects Thessaloniki with Serres.

On the 4 November 2020, due to the COVID-19 pandemic many services across the network were suspended.

Lines and services
Thessaloniki Suburban Railway consists of three lines:
 Line 3  connects  and Serres.

Trains run from approximately 6:00 am to 22:00 pm daily on a fairly irregular basis, roughly once an hour. Both lines, however somewhat complement each other between Thessaloniki and Platy. On 17 July 2014 services were cut back from eight to six services a day from Thessaloniki To Edessa.

List of stations

Thessaloniki-Larissa Line 

The Line connects the Macedonian regional capital with the Thessalian regional capital. It has a total of 12 stations and is displayed in blue on TRAINOSE maps. It was inaugurated on 9 September 2007 and initially connected Thessaloniki with Katerini and the beaches of South Pieria and Litochoro, while on 7 September 2008 with the completion of the electrification of the Thessaloniki-Domokos section of track services were extended to Larissa. The section Thessaloniki-Katerini-Litochoro is the first suburban connection outside of Athens. Today, services commence from Thessaloniki station passes through Sindos, Adendro, and Platy, where it is separated from the line Thessaloniki - Edessa, continues southeast to Korinos, the city of Katerini, Litochoro, and then south to Neos Resources of Pieria. Finally, it passes east of Rapsani, through Tempi, and after crossing the Evangelism of Larissa, it ends in the city of Larissa. The line connects the urban centres of Thessaloniki, Katerini, and Larissa, as well as Pieria's southern coast, thus connecting Central Macedonia's areas with Thessaly. In the future, the construction of an intermediate stop in Panteleimon between Neoi Poroi and Leptokarya is foreseen for the re-service of Platamonas.

Thessaloniki-Florina Line 
The Line connects the Macedonian regional capital with Florina in Western Macedonia. It has a total of 25 stations and is displayed in red on TRAINOSE maps. It was inaugurated in 2010 and initially connected Thessaloniki with Veria and Edessa. Later, the route to and from Florina was included in the line, which was initially operated by regional trains. In May 2008, the already existing line Thessaloniki-Edessa via Veria Line was included as a suburban service with the prospect of electrification in the near future.

Today, the service begins from Thessaloniki station, passing through Sindos, Adendro, and Plati Imathia, where it is separated from the Athens - Thessaloniki line, continues southwest to Veria, north to Naoussa and Skydra, and then west to Edessa and Lamb. Then, it continues southwest along Lake Vegoritida to Amyntaio, and after turning north to Vevi, it heads west for the last time to reach Florina. The line connected the urban centres of Thessaloniki, Veria, Florina, and Edessa as well as the waterfalls of the same name, thus uniting areas of Central and Western Macedonia.

Thessaloniki-Serres Line 
The Line connects the Macedonian regional capital with its second-largest city Serres. It has a total of 20 stations and is displayed in light blue on TRAINOSE maps. Services commenced on 3 February 2020 on what is the 3rd line of the Thessaloniki suburban network, Forming the daily connection of the two cities with existing intermediate stations.

Future expansion
This study, which was updated in March 2018 at a relevant conference in Giannitsa, awaits its finalization in accordance with the commitment of the then Prime Minister, at the regional development conference for Central Macedonia held in March 2018. Other projects include:

Thessaloniki - Amfipoli - Nea Zichni/Kavala.
Thessaloniki - Nea Michaniona - Epanomi - Moudania.
Thessaloniki - Giannitsa - Skydra - Aridea.
Aeginio-Sindos variant bypassing Plateos and Adendros to reduce time and add stations in Makrygialos, Methoni, and Skotina.
Diavata - Kordelio - Ionian Islands - Menemeni - Engine Room - Thessaloniki.
Sindos - Kalochori - Kordelio - Ionian Islands - KTEL - Koletti - PSST - Port of Thessaloniki.

See also
 Hellenic Railways Organisation
 Hellenic Train
 Proastiakos
 Thessaloniki Metro
 Piraeus–Platy railway
 Thessaloniki–Bitola railway
 Thessaloniki–Bitola railway
 Thessaloniki–Alexandroupoli railway
 Athens Suburban Railway
 Proastiakos Patras
 Rail transport in Greece

References

External links
  

Thessaloniki
Rail transport in Central Macedonia
Rail transport in Western Macedonia
Rail transport in Thessaly